Jiang Lizhang (born October 27, 1981 in Fu'an) is a Chinese businessman who owns Granada CF in Spain's La Liga, having bought a controlling stake for over €37m. He is also a part-owner of the NBA's Minnesota Timberwolves, having bought 5% of the franchise for around €45m, in February 2019 Minnesota Timberwolves Owner Glen Taylor Buys Back 5% Of Team Stake From Jiang, He founded Desports in 2004 and sold the sports marketing company in 2015, while staying in an executive position. In January 2017, he bought 90% of Chongqing Dangdai Lifan F.C.
He bought 60% of Parma Calcio 1913, having bought his stake in June 2017, but sold that entire stake to the Krause Group in 2020. He is also the investor of Portuguese football club Tondela.

References 

1981 births
People from Ningde
Businesspeople from Fujian
Living people
Granada CF
Chinese football chairmen and investors